The Sidney and Lowe Railroad  is a switching line that runs between Sidney, Nebraska, a connection with BNSF at Huntsman, Nebraska and a connection with Union Pacific at Brownson, Nebraska. It was founded in 1980 by Oscar J. Glover, President and CEO of Glover Group to service a railroad car maintenance and repair facility that Glover had built in the area near the United States Army's Big Sioux Depot. Glover later jointly built a grain storage and transfer facility that was serviced by the Sidney & Lowe Railroad. It became a common carrier in 1982 and was purchased by Progress Rail in 1996.

Nebraska railroads
Switching and terminal railroads
1980 establishments in Nebraska
Railway companies established in 1980